Murquztala (also, Murtuztala and Murguztala) is a village in the Balakan Rayon of Azerbaijan.  The village forms part of the municipality of Roçəhməd.

References 

Populated places in Balakan District